Feel Feelings is the third studio album by French singer-songwriter Soko. It was released on 10 July 2020 through Because Music and Babycat Records.

Critical reception

Feel Feelings has a score of 70 out of 100 on Metacritic, indicating "generally favorable reviews", based on 5 reviews. Heather Phares of AllMusic said "Soko demands the same commitment from her listeners that she put into making these songs, but as she combines happiness and sadness into something beautiful, the honesty in her music is mesmerizing." Chloe Johnson of MusicOMH reviewed "Feel Feelings represents the complexity of the human experience in that it’s not perfect, however the work put into this album is undeniable."

Track listing

References

2020 albums
Because Music albums
Soko (singer) albums
Albums produced by Patrick Wimberly